San Carlos is a city in the Maldonado Department of southern Uruguay. "San Carlos" is also the name of the municipality to which the city belongs. The municipality includes the following zones: San Carlos, El Tesoro, La Barra, Edén Rock, El Chorro, Manantiales, Balneario Buenos Aires, Punta Piedras, Santa Mónica, El Edén, Paso de la Cantera, Las Cañas, Carapé, Mataojo, Guardia Vieja, Pago de la Paja, Partido Norte, Partido Oeste, Cañada Bellaca, Corte de la Leña, Punta del Campanera, Puntas de Mataojo, and Laguna José Ignacio.

Geography
The stream Arroyo San Carlos flows along the east limits of the city and the park and neighbourhood of Parque Medina is situated across it.

History
It was founded on October 1763 by the Spanish Governor Pedro Antonio de Cevallos, to discourage the foundation of Portuguese settlements in the region. Its name is originated from that of the King of Spain at the time, Charles III.

It had acquired the status of "Villa" (town) before the Independence of Uruguay, which was elevated to "Ciudad" (city) on 18 December 1929 by the Act of Ley Nº 8.559.

Population
In 2011, San Carlos had a population of 27,471. This makes it the second largest city in Maldonado Department after the capital city of Maldonado. According to the Intendencia Departamnetal de Maldonado, the municipality of San Carlos has a population of 27,000.

 
Source: Instituto Nacional de Estadística de Uruguay

Economy
It is considered to be the agropecuarian centre of the region.

Places of worship
 Parish Church of St. Charles Borromeo (Roman Catholic)
 Parish Church of St. Pius X (Roman Catholic)
 San Carlos Ward LDS (Mormon)

Notable people
 Luis Barrios Tassano, lawyer and politician
 Manuel Basilio Bustamante, interim President
 Cayetano Alberto Silva, musician
 Mariano Soler, first Archbishop of Montevideo
 Francisco Antonino Vidal, President
 Marta Albertini, actress
 Leonardo Olivera, military officer
 Matías Britos, footballer
 Darío Pérez Brito, physician and politician
 Óscar de los Santos, politician
 Ruperto Elichiribehety, navy officer

See also
Viceroyalty of the Río de la Plata

References

External links

INE map of San Carlos and Parque Medina

 
Populated places in the Maldonado Department
Populated places established in 1763